Helen Burns Higgs (also known as Mrs. Leslie Higgs) (1897–1983) was a Bahamian writer, journalist and botanical illustrator. Higgs specialized in the culture of the Bahamas, including herbal medicine and cooking. She self-published four books: Flowers of Nassau, Bahamian Cook Book: Recipes by Ladies of Nassau, which documents Higgs' forty-five years of research on Bahamian cuisine shared by women in Nassau; Bush Medicine in the Bahamas, a collection about herbal medicine; and Presenting Nassau in 1936. Higgs provided the illustrations for Bush Medicine in the Bahamas. She wrote a weekly column for The Nassau Guardian for over 15 years, writing about agriculture, gardening and plants. She died in 1983 and is buried at Sacred Heart Church Cemetery in Nassau.

Publications
Higgs, Helen Burns. Presenting Nassau. Self-published (1936).
Higgs, Helen Burns. Flowers of Nassau. Miami: Miami Post Publishing Company (1956).
Mrs. Leslie Higgs. Bush Medicine in the Bahamas. Self-published (1974). 
Mrs. Leslie Higgs. Bahamian Cook Book: Recipes by Ladies of Nassau. Self-published (1957).

References

 
1897 births
1983 deaths
Bahamian writers
Bahamian women writers
Botanical illustrators